is a Japanese professional shogi player ranked 5-dan.

Early life
Takeuchi was born in Hiroshima, Japan on December 17, 1987. He learned how to play shogi from his grandfather, and was accepted in to the Japanese Shogi Association's apprentice school at the rank of 3-kyū as student of shogi professional  in 2004. 

Takeuchi was promoted to the rank of 3-dan in 2008, and obtained full professional status and the rank of 4-dan in April 2013 after finishing second in the 52nd 3-dan League (October 2012March 2013) with a record of 13 wins and 5 losses.

Promotion history
The promotion history for Takeuchi is as follows:
 3-kyū: September 2004
 3-dan: October 2009
 4-dan: April 1, 2013
 5-dan: September 13, 2018

References

External links
ShogiHub: Professional Player Info · Takeuchi, Yugo

Japanese shogi players
Living people
Professional shogi players
People from Hiroshima
Professional shogi players from Hiroshima Prefecture
1987 births